Lonmay railway station was a railway station in Lonmay, Aberdeenshire.

History 
The station was opened on 24 April 1865 by the Formartine and Buchan Railway. On the east side was the goods yard and at the north end of the platform was the signal box, which opened in 1892. The station closed on 4 October 1965.

References

 

Disused railway stations in Aberdeenshire
Beeching closures in Scotland
Former Great North of Scotland Railway stations
Railway stations in Great Britain opened in 1865
Railway stations in Great Britain closed in 1965